Elif is a Turkish TV series that aired weekly on Kanal 7,. It tells the story of a 6-year-old girl separated from her mother.

Synopsis

Season 1 
Elif, a pretty and kind 6-year-old girl, is in danger of being sold to pay the gambling debts of her stepfather, Veysel Şimşek. Her mother Melek escapes, but finds out that she is very sick. She leaves Elif in the protection of her best friend, Ayşe Doğan, a maid in a wealthy family's household. Ayşe tries to get permission from the Emiroğlu family to raise Elif in the mansion. However, she is holding a well-hidden secret: Elif is the biological child of Kenan, the beloved eldest son of the wealthy family. Kenan is unaware that Elif is his child from a past love his family forced him to leave. He is now married to Arzu Karapınar. They have a daughter, Tuğçe Emiroğlu, who is a very spoiled girl known for her bad temper. Elif is forced to live at the luxurious estate, away from her beloved mother, and unaware of her proximity to her biological father.

Season 2 
Kenan's wife, Arzu, feels threatened. She and her father, Necdet Karapınar, conspire to hide a secret from Kenan about her daughter Tuğçe that she is not his biological child, Arzu would do anything to keep her position in the family safe, creating danger for Elif. However, as crimes committed by Necdet and Arzu are exploded, Melek and Kenan reunite. Melek tries to ensure that Kenan and Elif will not be separated again.

Season 3 
Elif's life changes when her mother marries Yusuf. During their move to another city, Yusuf is killed in a car accident. Melek and  Elif  are separated again and Elif  finds herself in a hospital. Six months later, Elif  goes to Macide's house and attempts to start a new life, but faces pressure from Tarik, Macide's son-in-law. In pursuit of Macide's legacy, Tarik wants to get rid of elif but will he? However, Elif  has a supporter, Reyhan, who escaped from her family to study in Istanbul. She commits to protecting Elif  against the family members who want her gone. Meanwhile, Melek ends up homeless with lost memory, trying to find her daughter. When her temporary house gets destroyed, she goes to another house, where she's found by İnci, Tülay, and Veysel. Tarik also begins to attack Melek. Veysel is killed by Tarik and Melek finally finds her daughter working in Macide and Kerem's house. Meanwhile, Tulay and Inci are meeting with Elif and then are moving into another city. Tarik is arrested. Someone from Tarik's supporters tries to kill both Melek and Elif  but they survive.

Season 4
Macide's sister, Kiymet comes after 30 years to revenge her. In the past, her husband abandoned her pregnant and married Macide. Together with her son Mahir, they make evil plans against the Haktanir family. However, Mahir meets with Melek by chance, falls in love with her, and starts abandoning his evil goal. Meanwhile, Kiymet puts Melek in jail because she learns that she has an heir in the Haktanir family. Mahir sets her out of jail with the evidences pointing to Tarik's girlfriend Rana, who earlier plotted against both Hactanir and Melek instead of Kiymet. Melek reveals Kiymet's real face to Humeyra and Kerem and everything about her starts coming out. Meanwhile, Rana takes everything over from the Haktanir family. Finally, Mahir confesses to Kerem that he is Kiymet's son. Kiymet being unable to accept the defeat shoots Mahir, Kerem and Macide. She also tries to kill Rana, but she escapes. She reveals to Mahir that he is not the son of Macide's husband and manipulated him with this lie in order to achieve her revenge plan. Macide dies, Kerem is transferred to a hospital seriously injured and Mahir only suffers a light wound. Kiymet is arrested. Mahir, Melek, and Elif are finally together and happy.

Cast 
 İsabella Damla Güvenılır as Elif Emiroğlu (daughter of Melek and Kenan) 
 Selin Sezgin as Melek Özer (Elif's mother)

 Volkan Çolpan as Kenan Emiroğlu (Elif's father, in love with Melek)
 Cemre Melis Çınar as Arzu Karapınar (Tuğce's mother, Kenan's former wife, the main villain of the series)
 Zeynep Öğren as Tuğçe Emiroğlu (Illegitimate daughter of Arzu and Serdar)
 Hasan Ballıktaş as Veysel Şimşek (Melek's former husband, father of Zeynep and Murat)
 Emre Kıvılcım as Selim Emiroğlu (Kenan's younger brother, Zeynep's husband)
 Gülçin Tunçok as Zeynep Emiroğlu (Older daughter of Veysel, Selim's wife)
 Esin Benim as Ipek Emiroğlu (Aliye's daughter, younger sister of Kenan and Selim)
 Aysun Güven as Aliye Emiroğlu (Householder of Emiroğlu family, Elif's grandma)
 Batuhan Soncul as Murat Şimşek (Younger son of Veysel)
 Aysegul Yalçiner as Kiraz (Maid of Emiroğlu family)
 Ozanay Alpkan as Ayşe Doğan (Maid of Emiroğlu family, Melek's close friend)
 İlker Gürsoy as Melih Özer (Brother of Melek, and in love with Ipek)
 Dilara Yüzer as Gonca Tunç (Maid of Arzu, later marries Necdet and Serdar)
 Kıvılcım Kaya as Efruz Baba (Foster father of Melih)
 Kerem Akdeniz as Sadik (Kiraz's husband, assistant of Emiroğlu family)
 Pelin Çalışkanoğlu as Pelin (Ipek's friend, Zeynep's competitor for Selim)
 Sinem Akman as Feraye (Friend of Ipek and Pelin)
 Gürhan Gülbahar as Necdet Karapınar (Arzu's father, later marries Gonca, the main villain of the second season)
 Hakan Bozyiğit as Serdar Acar (Tuğçe's biological father)
 Umut Ölçer as Erkut Şahin (Veysel's friend, later becomes Necdet's assistant)
 Beril Eda Yeşil as Feride Çetin (Melek's close friend, in love with Murat)
 Derya Şen as Tülay Şimşek (Veysel's wife)
 Deniz İrem Morkoç as İnci Gürbüz (Elif's close friend)
 Tuğba Duygu Erman as Asuman Şahin (Older sister of İnci, Erkut's wife)
 Abdullah Şekeroğlu as Cemal Gürbüz (Father of Asuman and İnci)
 Asuman Kostak as Rabia (Cemal's elderly neighbour who looks after İnci)

References

External links 
 Official site

Turkish drama television series
Turkish television soap operas
2014 Turkish television series debuts
2019 Turkish television series endings
Television series by Fremantle (company)
Television series produced in Istanbul
Television shows set in Istanbul
Television series set in the 2010s